Dummugudem  is a village in Bhadradri Kothagudem district of the Indian state of Telangana. It is located in Dummugudem mandal of Bhadrachalam revenue division.

History 

On 30 November 1959, Dummagudem was carved out of East Godavari District and combined with the newly created district of Khammam.

Geography 
It has an average elevation of 47 metres (157 ft).

Dummugudem barrage across the Godavari River was constructed nearly 150 years back by the British India engineer Sir Arthur Cotton. A major lift irrigation project called Dummugudem Lift Irrigation Scheme is under development drawing water from the barrage pond. Dummugudem to Nagarjunasagar Dam tail pond lift canal is also under construction to transfer surplus Godavari river water to Krishna river.

Demography 
The subdivision has a population of 44,393 while Dummugudem town has a population of 3420 (2001 census). The subdivision had a literacy rate of 36% while Dummugudem town had a literacy rate of 65.8 as per the 2001 census. The literacy numbers show a contrast between rural and urban areas of the subdivision.

References 

Villages in Bhadradri Kothagudem district
Mandals in Bhadradri Kothagudem district